The 1979 Pittsburgh Panthers football team represented the University of Pittsburgh in the 1979 NCAA Division I-A football season. The Panthers competed in the 1979 Fiesta Bowl. Pitt was awarded the Lambert-Meadowlands Trophy as the champion of the East.

Schedule
In the Backyard Brawl, Pittsburgh was led by freshman quarterback Dan Marino. He directed Pitt to a 24–17 victory in the last college football game played at old Mountaineer Field.

Roster

Coaching staff

Team players drafted into the NFL

References

Pittsburgh
Pittsburgh Panthers football seasons
Fiesta Bowl champion seasons
Lambert-Meadowlands Trophy seasons
Pittsburgh Panthers football